Ann Christopher RA (born 4 December 1947) is a British sculptor known for her large-scale abstract works.

Early life and education

Ann Christopher was born on 4 December 1947 in Watford, Hertfordshire, and studied at the Harrow School of Art from 1965-1966 and the West of England College of Art in Bristol from 1966-1969. She lives and works north of Bath.

Career
Christopher's first solo exhibition was at the Mignon Gallery, Bath in 1969. She continued to have solo exhibitions throughout the 1970s and the 80s. In 1989, she had a retrospective of her work produced between 1969 and 1989 at the Dorset county Museum and Art Gallery. At first glance Christopher's elegantly understated sculpture seems to be tied to a series of simple formal decisions and aesthetic concerns about form and surface. However her making process is much more complex and instinctual. Once a basic shape is chosen and a template constructed, often out of material as humble as cardboard, it is built up using resin, giving depth and texture to the form before casting into Christopher's metal of choice and further worked laboriously by hand. Later, precise machine milled linear incisions are made to create a tension with the delicate hand finished surfaces.

Works
Christopher's commissioned work exist in many locations including the University of Bristol, the City of Bristol Museum and Art Gallery, the Chantrey Bequest, the Royal Academy of Arts in London, and World Wide Business Centres Inc., Philadelphia. A 1990 bronze by Christopher is located on Tower Bridge Road in London while her 1993 work Lines from Within is situated in Bristol's Castle Park.

Awards and honors
1968: First prize in the Harrison-Cowley Sculpture Competition
1971: Peter Stuyvesant Award; prize winner in the Daily Telegraph Magazine Young Sculptors Competition
1973: Birds Charity Award and Arts Council Award, Thornton Bequest
1976: South West Arts Award
1977: Arts Council Grant
1994: Silver Medal for Sculpture of Outstanding Merit by the Royal Society of British Sculptors 
1996: Frampton Award for sculpture in a public place
1997: Otto Beit Medal of Sculpture of Outstanding Merit 
Christopher was first elected to the Royal Academy in 1980 (ARA) becoming Royal Academician in 1989. She was elected a Fellow of the Royal Society of British Sculptors in 1992.

References

External links
 

1947 births
Living people
20th-century British sculptors
21st-century British sculptors
20th-century English women artists
21st-century English women artists
Alumni of the University of the West of England, Bristol
Alumni of the University of Westminster
English women sculptors
People from Watford
Royal Academicians